L.B. Landry College and Career Preparatory High School is a high school on the west bank of Orleans Parish in Algiers, New Orleans, Louisiana. 

The school opened in 2013 after the merger of L.B. Landry High School and O. Perry Walker College and Career Preparatory High School. It is named after Lord Beaconsfield Landry (1878–1934). The current nickname is the Charging Buccaneers, deriving from the O. Perry Walker's Chargers mascot and L.B. Landry's Buccaneers mascot.

History

L.B. Landry High School history
L.B. Landry High School, was a secondary school in the Whitney area of Algiers, New Orleans, Louisiana. It was originally named after Lord Beaconsfield Landry (1878–1934), an African American activist, physician, and vocalist who lived in Algiers.

The L.B. Landry School, originally an elementary school, opened on October 26, 1938. In 1942, it became a high school. It also was the first high school in Louisiana to be named after an African-American. It was the first high school on the west bank of New Orleans to enroll African-Americans regardless of income level. In 1952, it became a joint junior/senior high school. The main building was destroyed by a fire in 1958 and was rebuilt in 1959. In 1969, an annex opened. It contained an assembly hall, a theater, and 22 classrooms.

In 2005, Hurricane Katrina caused the school to close. The hurricane resulted in mold, rain, and wind-related damages in the school's building. Lentz said that there were few people who expected Landry to re-open. The architectural firm Eskew+Dumez+Ripple designed the new school. The three story campus was built with two gymnasiums, a space for a health center, and an auditorium with 650 seats.

The Recovery School District (RSD) stated that the school would open with four grade levels instead of beginning with one level, so its size would be justified. The school would take grades 7 through 10. In two years, the 7th and 8th grades would be phased out, replaced with grades 11 and 12. As of April 2010 the school collected over 200 applications for the ninth grade. The school re-opened in 2010. During the beginning of the first post-Katrina year of operation, there were reports of poor discipline and administrative turmoil. Mark Waller of the Times Picayune reported that teachers and students said that by October 2010 the school order dramatically improved. In December 2010, Louisiana State University opened a health clinic at Landry, replacing two smaller, temporary health clinics.

In the Spring of 2011, the school had 750 students in grades 7 through 10.

In October 2012 plans were announced to merge Walker High School and L.B. Landry High School into the new Landry Building and the campus would take the name of Walker High. The alumni of Landry High filed a lawsuit against the state, accusing it of ignoring a 2011 statute that asks the district to create a community outreach plan before finalizing "on any proposed changes in school governance" and unfairly calling Landry "low performing." The lawsuit was filed in District Civil Court in August 2012. The Associated Press stated "The case could be the first test of a law that requires community input on any changes in the way state-controlled schools are governed." Effective in the fall of 2013, the two schools merged onto the L.B. Landry High School campus.

L.B. Landry High School notable alumni
 Alvin Haymond, NFL cornerback
 Rich Jackson, NFL defensive end
 Lance Louis, NFL offensive guard
 Bobby Mitchell, blues singer
 James Ray, NBA power forward
 Cyril Richardson, NFL offensive guard (he transferred before his sophomore season)
 Virgil Robinson, NFL running back

O. Perry Walker High School history
O. Perry Walker College and Career Preparatory High School and Community Center was a high school on the west bank of Orleans Parish in Algiers, New Orleans, Louisiana. The school opened in 1970, was named after New Orleans School Superintendent Oliver Perry Walker (1899–1968). It was originally controlled by New Orleans Public Schools.

In 2005, as Hurricane Katrina was about to make landfall, the New Orleans Regional Transit Authority (RTA) designated O. Perry Walker as a place where people could receive transportation to the Louisiana Superdome, a shelter of last resort.

In 2012, the Associated Press stated that Walker was a "relatively high-performing school".

In October 2012 plans were announced to merge Walker High School and L.B. Landry High School into the new Landry Building and the campus would take the name of Walker High. Effective in the fall of 2013, the school merged on the rebuilt L. B. Landry High School campus.

O. Perry Walker High School notable alumni
 Patricia Clarkson (Class of 1977), actress
 Shannon Clavelle, NFL defensive end
 Milton Collins, CFL defensive back
 Craig Davis, NFL wide receiver
 Anthony Johnson, NFL defensive end
 Robert Kelley, NFL running back
 Keenan Lewis, NFL cornerback
 Kendrick Lewis, NFL free safety
 Bo McCalebb, overseas professional basketball player
 Ray Nagin, former mayor of New Orleans
 Ralph Norwood, NFL offensive tackle
 Chris Oldham, NFL cornerback (he transferred before his senior season)
 Mike Wallace, NFL wide receiver

Landry–Walker Prep history
The school was named after Lord Beaconsfield Landry and Oliver Perry Walker (1899–1968). In 2021, the school name was changed to L.B. Landry College and Career Preparatory High School in recognition that Walker, a former New Orleans Public School Superintendent, supported segregation.

Athletics
L.B. Landry College and Career Preparatory athletics competes in the LHSAA.

Championships
Landry–Walker Prep
Football: 2016

L.B. Landry
Football: 1959

References

External links

Landry-Walker College and Career Preparatory High School website

Charter schools in New Orleans
Preparatory schools in Louisiana
Public high schools in New Orleans
Educational institutions established in 2013
2013 establishments in Louisiana
Historically segregated African-American schools in Louisiana